Just how far back in history organized contests were held remains a matter of debate, but it is reasonably certain that they occurred in Greece almost 3,000 years ago. However ancient in origin, by the end of the 6th century BC at least four Greek sporting festivals, sometimes called "classical games," had achieved major importance: the Olympic Games, held at Olympia; the Pythian Games at Delphi; the Nemean Games at Nemea; and the Isthmian Games, held near Corinth. The Olympic Games were perhaps the greatest of these sporting events, and all Olympian victors were highly appreciated among the Greeks.

History

The sophist Hippias of Elis was the first who drew up the list of Olympians in his work Olympians inscription, based perhaps on the records of Olympia, and the oral tradition memories of the older Olympiads were still live in Olympia. Conventional beginning was considered the Olympiad of 776 BC, when Coroebus of Elis win the foot race named stadion. The work of Hippias revised and continued in the 4th century BC by Aristotle, later by Eratosthenes, then by Phlegon of Tralles (Seleucia of Caria) and many others. Thus formed a kind of Olympians' chronicle, which was already in 3rd century BC the base of the ancient dating system. Than younger tables survives complete the list of stadion winners by Sextus Julius Africanus (for the first 249 Olympiads), which included in a book by Eusebius of Caesarea.

List of Olympic winners in the Archaic period

The table below is an attempt to give a list (as complete as possible) of Olympic winners in the Archaic period (776 BC to 480 BC) combining all surviving sources. The work is based on records in the surviving historical and literary sources, race inscriptions, the texts of the Oxyrhynchus Papyri, the testimony of Pausanias and the list of Sextus Julius Africanus. The first column shows the serial number of any Olympiad, the second column the same date, the third column contains the game and the fourth column lists the name and origin of the winner, or marked with [...] if the element is not readable on the papyrus and giving whenever possible a version of what could contain when an investigation exists over this element.

Supplementary list
The supplementary list contains Olympic winners of this period known from literary and epigraphic records, but who have been dated only approximately and cannot be included in specific Olympiads.

Notes

References

Sources

See also

 List of ancient olympic victors
 Ancient Olympics in various places
 Olive wreath
 Olympic judges

Lists of Olympic medalists
Ancient Olympic Games
.
Ancient Greece-related lists
Olympic